Gierasch is a surname. Notable people with the surname include:

Adam Gierasch, screenwriter, film director, and actor. Also known for his professional work jointly with his wife Jace Anderson
Lila Gierasch (born 1948), American biochemist and biophysicist
Stefan Gierasch (1926–2014), American film and television actor